Fadrique Ignacio Iglesias Mendizábal (born October 12, 1980 in Cochabamba) is a Bolivian middle distance runner, who specialized in the 800 metres. He set both a national record and a personal best time of 1:48.16 by winning the silver medal for the 800 m at the 2006 Ibero-American Championships in Ponce, Puerto Rico.

Career
Iglesias made his official debut for the 2004 Summer Olympics in Athens, where he competed in the men's 800 m. He finished eighth in the first heat of the event by two thirds of a second (0.66) behind Azerbaijan's Alibay Shukurov, with a time of 1:51.87.

At the 2008 Summer Olympics, Iglesias ran in the sixth heat of the men's 800 m against seven other athletes, including Czech Republic's Jakub Holuša and Morocco's Amine Laalou, both of whom were heavy favorites of this event. He finished the race in seventh place by nearly two seconds behind Canada's Achraf Tadili, with a time of 1:50.57. Iglesias, however, failed to advance into the semi-finals, as he placed fifty-third overall, and was ranked farther below two mandatory slots for the next round.

Competition record

References

External links

NBC Olympics Profile

Bolivian male middle-distance runners
Living people
Olympic athletes of Bolivia
Athletes (track and field) at the 2004 Summer Olympics
Athletes (track and field) at the 2008 Summer Olympics
Athletes (track and field) at the 2007 Pan American Games
Pan American Games competitors for Bolivia
World Athletics Championships athletes for Bolivia
Sportspeople from Cochabamba
1980 births